Carlton Massey (January 17, 1930 – May 22, 1989) was a professional American football defensive lineman who played in the National Football League (NFL) for the Cleveland Browns (1954–1956) and Green Bay Packers (1957–1958). He attended Southwestern University and the University of Texas.

He was drafted by the Browns in the eighth round (95th overall) of the 1953 NFL draft and participated in the 1955 Pro Bowl. He wore the number 82 with the Browns and the number 81 with the Packers. Massey played a total of 49 games in his five NFL seasons. He had one interception in his career that was returned 24 yards.

References

1930 births
1989 deaths
American football defensive ends
American football ends
Cleveland Browns players
Green Bay Packers players
Southwestern Pirates football players
Texas Longhorns football players
All-American college football players
Eastern Conference Pro Bowl players
People from Rockwall, Texas
Players of American football from Texas